Paracles pallidivena is a moth of the subfamily Arctiinae first described by Schaus in 1904. It is found in Brazil.

References

Moths described in 1904
Paracles